Green Dragon Racing Team competed in the 2008-2009 Volvo Ocean Race. The team was captained by Ian Walker and finished the race in fifth place overall, scoring 63 points. The boat was designed by Reichel Pugh and built by McConaghy Boats.

Race Team

2008 in sailing
2009 in sailing
Volvo Ocean Race teams
Sailing in Ireland